Thomas Fermor, 1st Earl of Pomfret (1698 – 8 July 1753) was an English nobleman. 

He was the only son of William Fermor, 1st Baron Leominster by his third wife Lady Sophia Osborne. He succeeded to his father's barony on his death in 1711 as 2nd Baron Leominster. The Earldom of Pomfret was created for him on 27 December 1721, named after Pontefract in Yorkshire.

In September 1727 he was appointed master of the horse to Caroline, queen consort to the newly acceded George II—Fermor's wife was also made one of the ladies of Caroline's bedchamber. Caroline died in November 1737 and in September 1738 Thomas and his wife took a three-year tour in France and Italy, visiting Florence, Bologna, Venice, Augsburg, Frankfurt and Brussels.

Marriage and issue
On 14 July 1720 he married Henrietta Louisa Jeffreys, the only surviving child of John Jeffreys, 2nd Baron Jeffreys of Wem and granddaughter of George Jeffreys, 1st Baron Jeffreys. They had four sons and six daughters, including:
George Fermor, 2nd Earl of Pomfret (1722–1785), who succeeded his father
Lady Charlotte Fermor (1725–1813), later governess to the children of George III
Lady Sophia Frances Fermor (died 1745), wife of John Carteret, 2nd Earl Granville
Lady Juliana Fermor (1729-1801), later wife of Thomas Penn

References

|-

1
1698 births
1753 deaths